The Ekuma River is one of three rivers that supply a majority of water to the pan in the Etosha National Park in Namibia, the other two being the Oshigambo River and the Omurambo Ovambo River. The Ekumo is an ephemeral river that occasionally flows, or forms pools, during the rainy season.

References

Rivers of Namibia
Etosha National Park
Geography of Oshikoto Region